Natasha Alexandra Domínguez Boscán, is a Venezuelan actress. She was one of the finalists in the Elite Model Look Venezuela 2006 pageant, held in Caracas, Venezuela, on October 10, 2006. Domínguez was represented the Sucre state in the Miss Venezuela 2008 pageant, on September 10, 2008, and won the title of 1st runner up.

She represented Venezuela in the Reinado Internacional del Café 2009, in Manizales, Colombia, on January 10, 2009, and won the title of 2nd runner up.

She started her acting career with Telemundo in 2012, representing "Anita" in "El Rostro de la Venganza". She also participated in Grachi the third season as Maggie. Her most recent acting job was with Univision as “Amanda Cuadrado” in “La Piloto” and on Telemundo in 2018 as “Ashley Johnson” in “Mi Familia Perfecta”

Filmography

Film roles

Television roles

References

External links
 

1990 births
Living people
People from Caracas
Venezuelan female models
Venezuelan television actresses